Yuping may refer to:

Chinese county
 Yuping Dong Autonomous County (玉屏侗族自治县) or Yuping County (玉屏县), a county in Guangxi province.

Chinese town
 Yuping, Pingjiang (余坪镇), a town in Pingjiang County, Hunan province.